Elaheh Ahmadi (born May 31, 1982 in Tehran) is an Iranian sport shooter.  At the 2012 Summer Olympics, she reached the final in the women's 10 metre air rifle and also competed in the 50 metre rifle 3 positions.

Major achievements
  – 2010 ISSF World Cup, Beijing, China – 50 m rifle 3 positions
  – 2010 Asian Games, Guangzhou, China – 50 m rifle 3 positions
  – 2011 ISSF World Cup, Sydney, Australia – 10 m air rifle
  – 2015 ISSF World Cup, Qabala, Azerbaijan – 10 m air rifle
  – 2015 ISSF World Cup Final, Munich, Germany – 10 m air rifle
  – 2018 ISSF World Cup, Munich, Germany – 50 m rifle 3 positions

References

Profile

External links

1982 births
Living people
Iranian female sport shooters
ISSF rifle shooters
Asian Games silver medalists for Iran
Asian Games bronze medalists for Iran
Asian Games medalists in shooting
Islamic Azad University, Central Tehran Branch alumni
Olympic shooters of Iran
Shooters at the 2012 Summer Olympics
Shooters at the 2016 Summer Olympics
Shooters at the 2006 Asian Games
Shooters at the 2010 Asian Games
Shooters at the 2014 Asian Games
Shooters at the 2018 Asian Games
Medalists at the 2010 Asian Games
Medalists at the 2014 Asian Games
Islamic Solidarity Games competitors for Iran
Islamic Solidarity Games medalists in shooting
21st-century Iranian women